Neopseustis archiphenax is a species of moth belonging to the family Neopseustidae. It was described by Edward Meyrick in 1928. It is known from upper Burma and the Sichuan Province in China.

The wingspan is 26–27 mm.

References

Neopseustidae